San Nicolás Municipality may refer to:
 San Nicolás Municipality, Tamaulipas
 San Nicolás, Oaxaca

Municipality name disambiguation pages